Bergison Peak is the peak rising to 1985 m in the southern portion of Bastien Range in Ellsworth Mountains, Antarctica. The feature has steep and partly ice-free west slopes, and surmounts Karasura Glacier to the north, Nimitz Glacier to the northeast, and upper Minnesota Glacier to the southwest.

The peak is named after the Thracian fortress of Bergison in Southern Bulgaria.

Location
US mapping in 1961 and 1988.

See also
 Mountains in Antarctica

Maps
 Vinson Massif.  Scale 1:250 000 topographic map.  Reston, Virginia: US Geological Survey, 1988.
 Antarctic Digital Database (ADD). Scale 1:250000 topographic map of Antarctica. Scientific Committee on Antarctic Research (SCAR). Since 1993, regularly updated.

Notes

References
 Bergison Peak. SCAR Composite Gazetteer of Antarctica.
 Bulgarian Antarctic Gazetteer. Antarctic Place-names Commission. (details in Bulgarian, basic data in English)

External links
 Bergison Peak. Copernix satellite image

Ellsworth Mountains
Bulgaria and the Antarctic
Mountains of Ellsworth Land